Hypagoptera is a genus of moths in the subfamily Arctiinae. It contains the single species Hypagoptera rufeola, which is found in South Africa.

References

External links

Natural History Museum Lepidoptera generic names catalog

Endemic moths of South Africa
Lithosiini
Moths described in 1900
Monotypic moth genera
Moths of Africa